Reena Ranger OBE (Punjabi:ਰੀਨਾ ਰੇਂਜਰ) (born in London) is a British community leader, politician and businesswoman.

Career 
Ranger has been working in the family firm set up by her father Rami Ranger since her twenties.

She is founder and chair of Women Empowered, a social enterprise empowering women through panel discussions and networking. Her guests have included Vivek Oberoi and Gurinder Chadha, amongst other notable individuals.

Ranger attended the Transatlantic International Leaders Network in 2017, where she spoke about the importance of networks for 'women of colour' which led to the development of an 'EU women's group'.

She is an active member of the Conservative Party, and has spoken at the party conference on 'fighting injustices'. She was selected as the Conservative party candidate for Birmingham Hall Green, a safe seat for the Labour Party, at the 2017 general election, but was unsuccessful, coming a distant second. Her father, now Lord Ranger, is a businessman and Conservative party donor who was nominated for a life peerage and a seat in the House of Lords in Theresa May's 2019 resignation honours. Reena Ranger has been a Three Rivers District Councillor representing Moor Park and Eastbury since 2014.

Prior to the 2019 general election, Ranger was defeated by two votes to become the Conservative candidate for South West Hertfordshire, a safe seat for the party, by Gagan Mohindra. Her parents – both members of the party – failed to attend the selection meeting.

Honours 
In the 2019 Birthday Honours, Reena Ranger was appointed an Officer of the Order of the British Empire for services to BAME women.

Views 
Ranger believes in the power of networking and supports stem cell donation.

See also 
 List of British Sikhs

References 

21st-century English businesspeople
Officers of the Order of the British Empire
Daughters of life peers
English politicians
English people of Punjabi descent
Year of birth missing (living people)
Living people
Conservative Party (UK) councillors
Councillors in Hertfordshire
British politicians of Indian descent
Women councillors in England